The Women's discus throw at the 2014 Commonwealth Games, as part of the athletics programme, took place at Hampden Park on 31 July and 1 August 2014.

Results

Qualifying round

Final

References

Women's discus throw
2014
2014 in women's athletics